Die Happy is a German alternative rock band from Ulm. The group was founded in 1993 by Czech singer Marta Jandová and Thorsten Mewes. Even though the band is based in Germany, their songs are written and performed almost exclusively in English.

Band members 
 Marta Jandová (vocals)
 Thorsten Mewes (guitar)
 Ralph Rieker (bass)
 Jürgen Stiehle (drums)

Discography

Albums

Singles 

DVDs
 The Weight of the Circumstances (2003)
 10 – Live and Alive (2004)

References

External links 

  
 Official German fan club
 Die Happy Russian club

German alternative rock groups
Alternative metal musical groups
Musical groups established in 1993
Participants in the Bundesvision Song Contest
1993 establishments in Germany
English-language singers from Germany
GUN Records artists